Swamy Ra Ra is a 2013 Indian Telugu-language crime comedy film directed by Sudheer Varma in his directorial debut and produced by Chakri Chirugupati under Lakshmi Narasimha Entertainments. It stars Nikhil Siddharth and Swathi Reddy while Pooja Ramachandran and Ravi Babu play supporting roles. In the film, Surya, along with his pickpocket friends are chased by a dangerous goon as he wants to deliver a stolen golden Vinayaka idol to a minister.

The film was released on 23 March 2013, and became a  sleeper hit at box office. It was considered as one of the "25 Greatest Telugu Films Of The Decade" by Film Companion and was remade in Kannada as Jamboo Savari (2014).

Plot
The idol, which actually belongs to the newly found treasure of the Mandir is sold to a mysterious person who dies after his car meets with an accident. A kid takes the Murti from the ground and presents it to his friend who in turn presents it to her daughter-in-law.

Surya, Bhanu, Ravi and Swati. While Surya, Bhanu, Ravi are pickpocketers who rob people together, Swati is a Journalist whose parents left for the United States for a short duration. Swati buys a Yellow color Vespa vehicle which is stolen by Surya while being chased by a person as Surya and Ravi rob him. After giving a complaint to the Police, Swati finds Surya riding her Vehicle. Surya, after being stopped by Swati, represents himself as a software engineer working at HP who bought this vehicle from a third party. Surya and Swati become friends and Surya later introduces Bhanu and Ravi to Swati as his colleagues in HP. Meanwhile, Giri goes to buy the idol from the Trader on behalf of Gangster Durga Prasad whose obligation is to deliver the idol to a Minister in order to get exonerated from all his cases and joining politics. Giri kills the Trader, takes the idol and goes to Durga's house and gives him the money he sent for and tells that the trader was dead and the idol is missing.

Later, Durga gives the same bag to his personal criminal Lawyer and finds blood stains on the bag. He sends his henchmen to trace Giri and get the idol from him. However, Giri keeps the idol in the Hand Bag of Swati when he hits Surya and Swati when they were riding their Vespa vehicle and notes the vehicle number. At Swati's home, Chotu, a kid who is a friend of Surya, steals the idol from her handbag and gives it to Surya. Surya along with Bhanu and Ravi approaches Shankar via Jogi, who is entitled to a commission of 10% of the sale price. Shankar decides to buy it for 5 crores but Ravi foolishly reveals in a hurry that they are lucky to get 5 lakhs. They leave for Swati's house that night and celebrate terming salary hike as the reason. The next morning,  Durga goes to Swati's home and searches her handbag, where he kills Giri in front of them and demands them to tell the whereabouts of the idol. During the journey to Shankar's house, two professional killers threaten them to vacate the car as they are in a hurry to escape from the cops.

At this point, the trio and Swati flee to Swati's friend Dolly's house. Shankar sells the idol to two Nigerian thugs (Alex and Elves) who approached Shankar via Jogi. There one of the Nigerian thugs gets tempted after he sees Vijji, a close person of Shankar. Jogi is insulted by Shankar by denying to give his commission after the Nigerian gang leaves. Jogi calls the trio to meet him the next hour. There Jogi asks Surya to get Shankar's purse before he reaches the place of Consignment where the price would be transferred by showing a  note given by the Nigerian thug duo. If the note is brought, it would be shared among the trio and Jogi in equal ratio. The trio successfully snatches Shankar's purse without his knowledge and tear the note into two equal halves, one with Surya and other with Jogi. Surya learns that Swati has been kidnapped by Durga and he requires the idol in an hour in order to set Swati free. Thus Surya calls Shankar and learns from him that the idol is in Novotel after he gave his half note. Jogi then calls Shankar to bring  in exchange for the other half to Novotel.

Meanwhile, Vijji succeeds in seducing the Nigerian thug, allowing her to tie him up and gets the locker code and flees with the idol. Surya after trashing the other in the same way learns about the locker code, goes to the room only to find an empty locker and being chased by the armed Nigerian thugs. At the cellar of Novotel, Shankar gets his half note and shows the 5 crores cash in a bag. In no time the trio, ignorant of the presence of the bag in the car, get into the car along with Vijji and leave. Shankar chases them in his car, Jogi chases them in his friend's car, the Nigerian thugs hijacks a car and chases them. Bhanu snatches the idol from Vijji and leaves her away on the road. Surya is summoned by Durga to Dog House to give the idol and take Swati away. The cars of Surya, Shankar, Jogi, the Nigerian thugs, the Minister reach there and all of them enter the Dog House. The professional Killers, who robbed Durga's car in the past are employed by the Minister to kill Durga, reach there and wait outside for the right time.

A Mexican standoff ensues, with Shankar aiming at Surya who in turn is aimed by Jogi with a gun. Jogi is aimed at by the Nigerian thugs who are in turn aimed by Durga. Durga is aimed by a Gangster who in turn is aimed at by Durga's henchman. The Minister who enters at this point is aimed by Shankar with his second gun, forming a nearly completed circle. The killers entered the room and in chaos, everyone is killed except the trio, Swati, Durga and one of the Nigerian thugs. The Nigerian thugs and Durga shoot each other fatally and the trio along with Swati flee with the idol. In the journey to home, Swati declares her love for Surya to her mother in his presence. Meanwhile, the tire gets punctured and the trio gets down to check the tire, but in the car's decklid, they find the bag containing 5 crores. The trio jump in joy while Swati is ignorant of this and remains normal. The idol is sent back to Anantha Padmanabha Swamy Temple and the film ends with Surya trying to secure a job in HP before Swati's parents return.

Cast
 Nikhil Siddharth as Surya
 Swati Reddy as Swati
 Ravi Babu as Durga Prasad
 Pooja Ramachandran as Bhanu
 Jeeva as Shankar
 Ravi Varma as Giri
 Praveen as Jogi
 Satya as Ravi
 Bhanu
 Jogi Krishnam Raju
 Jogi Naidu
 Master Sathwik as Chotu
 Murali Krishna
 Nara Rohit (narrator)

Production
This is the second film from Lakshmi Narasimha Entertainments.

Casting
Nikhil plays the role of a pick-pocketer in this film. Nikhil mentioned in his Twitter that he is excited to work with actor Ravi Babu, who is playing a crucial role in the film.

Filming
The film started its regular shooting on 16 July 2012 at Attapur in Hyderabad. The 1st schedule of the film was completed on 7 August 2012 in the surroundings of Hyderabad. The 2nd schedule started on 22 August and was completed on 7 September 2012. A schedule was started in the surroundings of Hyderabad on 23 September 2012 it was continued to 6 October 2012. A 20-day schedule started on 14 October 2012. Some key scenes and songs were shot in Kerala and Tamil Nadu.

Soundtrack

Launch
The audio was launched on 23 January 2013 at Taj Deccan in Hyderabad. It was attended by Nani, Srinivas Avasarala, Allari Naresh, Manoj Manchu, Nara Rohit, Sunil, Regina, Nandini Reddy, Mohan Krishna Indraganti and BVSN Prasad.

Track list
The film's music was composed by Sunny M.R. Musicperk.com rated the album 8/10, quoting "A fresh waft of cool music! Experimental Magic with simplicity".

Release
The film was given 'U/A' certificate. It was released on 23 March 2013. Cinema5, a subsidiary of TV5, distributed the film in the United States.

Reception 
The film received positive reviews from critics. Jeevi of Idlebrain rated the film 3.25/5 stated that Swamy Ra Ra is a class crime comedy. And you can watch it. Oneindia.com rated the film 3/5 stating that Nikhil's action is one of the biggest plus point's for the film. Sify gave a review of rating 3/5 stating Swamy Ra Ra has many positives to talk about: stylized narration, some interesting sequences and the superb music. Karthik Pasupulate of The Times of India gave rating 3.5/5 and stated it all you feel like you seen some cinema and not some mish mashed formula package. The Hindu stated that "The film will pick-pocket your brain and you'll most probably end up feeling richer, if not a millionaire."

Awards and nominations

Legacy  
After the success of the film, Nikhil Siddharth and Swathi Reddy starred in Karthikeya (2014).

References

External links
 

2010s Telugu-language films
2013 films
Indian crime comedy films
Telugu films remade in other languages
Films shot in Hyderabad, India
Films shot in Kerala
Films shot in Tamil Nadu
2013 directorial debut films
2010s crime comedy films
Films set in Hyderabad, India
Films directed by Sudheer Varma